Daw Mya Sein (13 October 1904 – 10 November 1988) was a Burmese writer, educator and historian. She led the Burma Women's Council, served as a representative of Asia for the League of Nations in 1931, and as a representative at the Geneva Women's Conference; she was recommended for roundtable attendance by the British government and by several international women's organizations.

Early life and education
Mya Sein was born in Moulmein (present-day Mawlamyine), British Burma. She is the youngest child of three of May Oung, a legal scholar who served Minister of Home Affairs of British Burma, and his wife Thein Mya, a great-granddaughter of Htaw Lay, Governor of Dala. She attended Diocesan Girl's High School and St. Mary's SPG High School. She was ranked as the fifth best high school student in the whole country in 1919. She continuing educated at Rangoon College, she got ranking first and was awarded Jardin Prize. She graduated from Rangoon University in 1927 and continuing educated in Oxford University in 1928.

Career and works

Mya Sein was the first Burmese woman to graduate from Oxford University in the late 1930. From 1931 to 1933, She served as a representative of Asia for the League of Nations, representative of Geneva Women Conference and representative to the Burma Round Table Conference in London. From 1939 to 1942, She served as a representative member of the Burmese-Chinese Peace and chairwoman of the Yangon Education Board. From 1950 to 1960, Mya Sein was a lecturer of history and political science at Rangoon University. After her retirement, she became a visiting professor of Burmese history and culture at Columbia University in New York. As a prolific writer, Mya Sein penned many articles on Burma in international publications, notably penning the "Administration of Burma" in 1938, "Burma" in 1944 and "The Future of Burma" also in 1944.

Books
 Administration of Burma (1938)
 Burma (1944)
 The Future of Burma (1944)

Personal life
Mya Sein was married to ICS U Shwe Baw in 1933 and divorce in 1954, she had one son and one daughter, Mya Baw and Mya Thandar. She died on 10 November 1988 at the age of 84.

References 

1904 births
1988 deaths
Alumni of the University of Oxford
20th-century Burmese women writers
20th-century Burmese writers
People from Mawlamyine
Burmese people of Mon descent
People from British Burma